The Nuremberg Cup was a women's professional tennis tournament held in Nuremberg, Germany. Held from 2013 until 2019, this 250-level tournament was played on outdoor clay courts.

Tournament history 

The Nuremberg Open was a defunct men's tennis tournament that was played on the Grand Prix tennis circuit in 1976. The event was held in Nuremberg, West Germany and was played on indoor carpet courts.  Frew McMillan won the singles title while partnering with Karl Meiler to win the doubles title.

The Nürnberger Versicherungscup (sponsored by Nürnberger Versicherungsgruppe) was a professional women's tennis tournament played on outdoor clay courts in Nuremberg. The event was affiliated with the Women's Tennis Association (WTA), and was an International-level tournament on the WTA Tour. The inaugural 2013 edition took place the week after the French Open while from 2014 to 2019, the event was scheduled the week before the French Open.

In January 2020, the tournament licence was reported to be taken over by an association around the former manager of German hockey club Kölner Haie, Oliver Mueller, after the Austrian Reichel family had retired, hence a relocation to Cologne was expected for 2021. This reestablishment in the Rhineland has not been achieved.

Past finals

Women

Singles

Doubles

Men

Singles

Doubles

References

External links
 ATP results page

 
WTA Tour
Clay court tennis tournaments
Tennis tournaments in Germany
Sports competitions in Nuremberg
Recurring sporting events established in 2013
2013 establishments in Germany
Grand Prix tennis circuit
Indoor tennis tournaments